Stenotis is a genus of flowering plants belonging to the family Rubiaceae.

Its native range is Arizona (USA) to Mexico.

Species:
 Stenotis arenaria (Rose) Terrell 
 Stenotis asperuloides (Benth.) Terrell

References

Rubiaceae
Rubiaceae genera